Phyllonorycter reduncata is a moth of the family Gracillariidae. It is known from the Russian Far East.

References

reduncata
Moths described in 1986
Moths of Asia